Matthew Worthy is a British TV format creator and Executive Producer. He is also the Joint Managing Director of Stellify Media, alongside his creative and business partner, Kieran Doherty. Worthy & Doherty have co-created multiple entertainment formats - including the international formats Secret Fortune and Take The Money and Run - while working for UK independent production company Wild Rover Productions. In 2014 Worthy & Doherty launched the production company Stellify Media as a joint venture with Sony Pictures Television.  Stellify Media is best known for successfully rebooting Who Wants to Be a Millionaire? with Jeremy Clarkson for ITV, and Blind Date with Paul O'Grady for Channel 5. 


Career 
Worthy began his career at Granada Entertainment working as a researcher on Stars in Their Eyes, You've Been Framed and Celebrities Under Pressure. While working for Granada Kids on the show Jungle Run in 2005 – Worthy devised the show Scratch and Sniff's Den of Doom for CiTV.

He joined Wild Rover Productions in 2006 to create the BBC One interactive quiz Get Smarter in a Week – and went on to consult on the international versions. Worthy worked in a creative partnership with Kieran Doherty at Wild Rover; together they created several international TV formats. Worthy was the Producer of the first two series of Secret Fortune for BBC One.

Production credits

References 

British television writers
British television producers
Living people
Year of birth missing (living people)